South African National Halaal Authority (-S.A.N.H.A-) is a local profit organization certifying halal food and products in South Africa. The authority's goal is to oversimplify the recognition and purchase of halal food across all stores in South Africa instead of having halal products sold in a select group of halal-only stores. The organization has offices in Mpumalanga, Gauteng, and Western Cape.

Halal certification
SANHA examines products according to a set of Islamic dietary criteria. When a product meets the criteria, it gets certified which means a permission to add the "halaal certified" logo on the packaging, letting consumers know that the product is in compliance with halal dietary requirements.

References

Islamic organisations based in South Africa
Food and drink in South Africa
Halal certification